The United Textile Factory Workers' Association (UTFWA) was a trade union federation in Great Britain.  It was active from 1889 until 1975.

Objectives

The federation was founded in 1889, to represent the various textile workers' unions in political matters.  A successor to the Northern Counties Factory Acts Reform Association, it had a broader outlook, not just campaigning on the implementation and extension of the Factory Acts.

The UTFWA initially represented around 125,000 workers, three-quarters within twenty miles of Bolton in Lancashire.  By the early twentieth century, its members were organised in the Amalgamated Association of Card and Blowing Room Operatives, Amalgamated Association of Operative Cotton Spinners, Amalgamated Association of Beamers, Twisters and Drawers, Amalgamated Weavers' Association, General Union of Loom Overlookers and Operative Bleachers, Dyers and Finishers Association.  Later members included the Amalgamated Textile Warehousemen, the General Warp Dressers' Association of Lancashire and Yorkshire, and the Ball Warpers' Association.

The new federation had a General Council with about two hundred members of local unions, and a Legislative Council of full-time leaders.  However, its member unions did not always engage with its structures, and the General Council did not meet between 1896 and 1899.

Early years

In its early years, the association attempted to introduce a bill reducing working hours, but dropped the proposal after it was only narrowly passed in a ballot of members.  It also hoped to sponsor parliamentary candidates for both the Conservative Party and Liberal Party, but decided not to pursue this following a lack of interest from the Conservatives and opposition from James Mawdsley.  However, it did achieve some success in campaigning against Indian tariffs on cotton imports, as the rates were reduced to below those on other materials.

In 1902, breaking with its previous policy, the UTFWA supported David Shackleton's candidature for the Labour Representation Committee (LRC) in Clitheroe.  He was elected and, the following year, the Association affiliated to the LRC.  The Cardroom Workers quit the association a few years later after none of its members were adopted as parliamentary candidates, but rejoined in 1916.

In 1920, some of its member unions moved for the association to extend its remit to industrial matters, but this was not adopted.

Demise

The federation was dissolved on 1 December 1975, following the decline of the industry and the merger of its two largest affiliates into the Amalgamated Textile Workers' Union.

Election results
The federation sponsored a large number of Labour Party candidates, many of whom won election.

Leadership

Secretaries
1889: Thomas Birtwistle
c.1892: James Mawdsley
1902: Joseph Cross
1925: James Bell
1931: Cephas Speak
1943: Ernest Thornton
1953: Harold Bradley
1958: James Milhench
1968: Joseph Richardson

Presidents
1889: David Holmes
1890s: William Mullin
1913: William C. Robinson
1919: Walter Gee
1924: William Thomasson
1935: Archie Robertson
1953: William Roberts
1958: Harold Chorlton
1964: Jim Browning

See also
 History of trade unions in the United Kingdom

References

Further reading
 Griffiths, Trevor. The Lancashire Working Classes: C. 1880-1930 (Oxford University Press on Demand, 2001).
 Procter, Stephen, and J. S. Toms. "Industrial Relations and Technical Change: Profits, Wages and Costs in the Lancashire Cotton Industry, 1880-1914." Journal of Industrial History 3#1 (2000): 54-72. online
 Singleton, J. Lancashire on the scrapheap: The cotton industry, 1945–70 (Oxford UP, 1991).
 Tippett, L.H.C. A portrait of the Lancashire cotton industry (Oxford UP, 1969).
 White, Joseph L. "Lancashire Cotton Textiles," in Chris Wrigley, A History of British industrial relations, 1875-1914 (Univ of Massachusetts Press, 1982) pp 209–229.

 
Defunct trade unions of the United Kingdom
National trade union centres of the United Kingdom
Cotton industry trade unions
1889 establishments in the United Kingdom
1975 disestablishments in the United Kingdom
Trade unions established in 1889
Trade unions disestablished in 1975